Lanta or LANTA may refer to:

Places
Lanta, West Virginia, United States
Lanta, Haute-Garonne, France
 Lanta Islands, Thailand
 Ko Lanta Yai, the largest of the Lanta Islands
 Ko Lanta Noi, in Ko Lanta District
 Koh Lanta National Park, Krabi Province, Thailand

Other uses
 Lanta (cockroach), a genus of cockroaches in the family Ectobiidae
 Lehigh and Northampton Transportation Authority (LANTA)
 Christian Lanta, rugby coach for Lyon OU

See also
 
 Lantana (disambiguation)